"Pushin' Me Away" is a song by American pop rock band the Jonas Brothers for their third studio album A Little Bit Longer (2008). It was written by band members Nick Jonas, Joe Jonas and Kevin Jonas; production was helmed by John Fields. The song is a pop rock and teen pop influenced track. "Pushin' Me Away" received generally favorable reviews from contemporary music critics, who complimented its overall production. It was released as the second promotional single from the album and peaked at number 16 on the U.S. Billboard Hot 100.

Release Date

"Pushin' Me Away" was supposed to have been released on July 15, 2008, and it is the release date for the song on the iTunes music store, but the song went on sale on the evening of July 14, 2008.

Like all the other songs this song was recorded during The Best of Both Worlds Tour where they were the opening act. The song was also used in Jonas Brothers: The 3D Concert Experience.

Charts

Weekly charts

References

2008 songs
Jonas Brothers songs
Songs written by Nick Jonas
Songs written by Joe Jonas
Songs written by Kevin Jonas
Song recordings produced by John Fields (record producer)